Jidlabe is a town in the north-central Mudug region of Somalia.

References
Jiidlabe: Somalia

Populated places in Mudug